Porina gryseelsiana is a species of foliicolous lichen belonging to the family Porinaceae. It was discovered in Orientale Province, in the Democratic Republic of the Congo on the leaves of understorey plants in a tropical rainforest. It was subsequently described as new to science in 2014. It is a rare species which is only known from this one collection.

It resembles Porina octomera in appearance but can be differed from it by its orange-brown perithecia and larger spores. The photobiont of this species is the green alga Phycopeltis.

References

Gyalectales
Lichen species
Lichens of the Democratic Republic of the Congo
Lichens described in 2014
Taxa named by Robert Lücking